Prokhladnensky District is an administrative and a municipal district (raion), one of the ten in the Kabardino-Balkar Republic, Russia. It is located in the northeast of the republic. Its administrative center is the town of Prokhladny (which is not administratively a part of the district). As of the 2010 Census, the total population of the district was 45,533.

Administrative and municipal status
Within the framework of administrative divisions, Prokhladnensky District is one of the ten in the Kabardino-Balkar Republic and has administrative jurisdiction over all of its forty-one rural localities. The town of Prokhladny serves as its administrative center, despite being incorporated separately as a town of republic significance—an administrative unit with the status equal to that of the districts.

As a municipal division, the district is incorporated as Prokhladnensky Municipal District. Its forty-one rural localities are incorporated into nineteen rural settlements within the municipal district. The town of republic significance of Prokhladny is incorporated separately from the district as Prokhladny Urban Okrug, but serves as the administrative center of the municipal district as well.

References

Notes

Sources

Districts of Kabardino-Balkaria
